Giovani dos Santos (born 1 July 1981) is a Brazilian long-distance runner who won a bronze medal in the 10,000 m event at the 2011 Pan American Games.

References

1981 births
Living people
Brazilian male long-distance runners
Pan American Games medalists in athletics (track and field)
Pan American Games bronze medalists for Brazil
South American Games silver medalists for Brazil
South American Games medalists in athletics
Athletes (track and field) at the 2011 Pan American Games
Athletes (track and field) at the 2015 Pan American Games
Competitors at the 2014 South American Games
Medalists at the 2011 Pan American Games
20th-century Brazilian people
21st-century Brazilian people